Great Day! Rare Recordings From The Judy Garland Show is a music CD by Judy Garland which was released on June 6, 2006.

Track listing 
This Could Be The Start Of Something
I Love You 
Swing Low, Sweet Chariot / The Whole World In His Hands
Poor Butterfly 
Steppin' Out With My Baby
When The Sun Comes Out
Make Someone Happy
Time After Time
A Lot Of Livin' To Do
Don't Ever Leave Me 
Lorna
It's A Good Day 
World War I Medley
America The Beautiful
Seventy-Six Trombones
Suppertime
I'm On My Way
Great Day

External links
 The Judy Garland Online Discography "Great Day!" page.

Judy Garland albums
2006 compilation albums